Adua and Her Friends, also known as Hungry For Love, is a 1960 Italian film directed by Antonio Pietrangeli with a collaborative screenplay by the film's director together with Ruggero Maccari, Ettore Scola and Tullio Pinelli. The movie is about four prostitutes who start a restaurant after their brothel is shut down by the Merlin law, which made brothels illegal in Italy.

Plot
In 1958, the Merlin law made brothels illegal in Italy. Adua, Lolita, Marilina and Millie are four prostitutes whose brothel in Rome is shut down. Under Adua's leadership, they pool their savings, two million lire apiece, to open a restaurant on the outskirts, which will be a cover for an illegal brothel. They rent a run-down building and hire workmen to fix it up but, when they apply for a permit to open the restaurant, their application is rejected because of their history of prostitution. One of Adua's former customers, Ercoli, agrees to buy the building and use his connections to get the permit in his name, in return for a rent of one million lire a month.

The restaurant turns out to be unexpectedly successful, and the women effectively abandon their plans to offer sexual services and start to lead respectable lives. Marilina brings her young son to live with her and Millie falls in love and plans to marry. But the restaurant doesn't earn as much as they could make as a brothel, and they can't pay Ercoli his rent. Ercoli gives them an ultimatum: start working as prostitutes again, and pay him his rent, or he will kick them out in 24 hours. When Ercoli returns, Adua refuses to pay and humiliates him, and he leaves. In revenge, he has them all arrested for prostitution. Their pictures appear in the newspapers and their respectable lives are destroyed. Adua, who has sworn never to suffer the fate of a worn-out old prostitute, ends up working in the streets again. In the final scene, on a dismal rainy night, she is rejected in favor of a younger woman.

Cast
Simone Signoret: Adua Giovannetti
Sandra Milo: Lolita
Emmanuelle Riva: Marilina
: Milly
Claudio Gora: Ercoli
Ivo Garrani: Avvocato
Gianrico Tedeschi: Stefano
Antonio Rais: Emilio
Duilio D'Amore: Frate Michele
Valeria Fabrizi: Fosca la bionda
Luciana Gilli: Dora
Enzo Maggio: Calypso
Domenico Modugno: Himself
Marcello Mastroianni: Piero Silvagni

Sources

External links 
 

1960 films
1960 comedy films
Italian black-and-white films
Commedia all'italiana
Films directed by Antonio Pietrangeli
1960s Italian-language films
Films set in Rome
Films shot in Rome
Films about prostitution in Italy
Films with screenplays by Ruggero Maccari
Italian comedy films
1960s Italian films